Northgate is a  neighborhood in north Seattle, Washington, named for and surrounding Northgate Mall, the first covered mall in the United States.
Its east-west principal arterials are NE Northgate Way and 130th Street, and its north-south principal arterials are Roosevelt Way NE and Aurora Avenue N (SR 99).  Minor arterials are College Way-Meridian Avenue N, 1st, 5th, and 15th avenues NE.  Interstate 5 runs through the district. Besides the eponymous mall, the most characteristic distinctions of the area are North Seattle College (NSC) and the south fork of the Thornton Creek watershed and Seattle Kraken Iceplex center.

History

Prehistory
What is now Northgate has been inhabited since the end of the last glacial period (c. 8,000 BCE—10,000 years ago).  The Dkhw’Duw’Absh, People of the Inside and Xacuabš, People of the Large Lake, Lushootseed (Skagit-Nisqually) Coast Salish native people had used the Liq'tid Springs area as a spiritual health spa.  They harvested cranberries from the Slo’q `qed (SLOQ-qed, bald head), an 85 acre (34 ha) marsh and bog at what is now the NSCC car park, Interstate 5 interchange, and Northgate Mall.  Large open areas for game habitat and foraging (anthropogenic grasslands) were maintained in what are now these neighborhoods by selective burning every few years.  Today the Native American descendants are represented by the Duwamish tribe.

Development

The Northgate area has been subject to a large amount of residential and commercial development in the last few years, and many huge projects are underway. The height limits in the area have been increased to 85' to allow for further population growth.

In 2009 the Northgate Mall was remodeled and added dozens more retail shops. In 2006, a new park, library, and community center opened in the Northgate neighborhood across 5th Ave NE from Northgate Mall. These are part of the city's plan to accelerate development in Northgate.

While there is much commerce in the area, hotel development has been limited with only the Hotel Nexus, previously a Ramada Inn, being the only upscale hotel in the area.  The many motels lining Aurora Avenue are further northwest than the Northgate neighborhood.

Dense mixed-use development is expected to be constructed adjacent to Northgate station on Link light rail, which opened in October 2021 as the terminus of the Northgate Link Extension. Northgate will also be home to the headquarters and team practice facility of the Seattle Kraken beginning in 2021.

Neighborhoods

Northgate neighborhoods are (north to south):
 
 Haller Lake
 Pinehurst
 Licton Springs or North College Park
 Maple Leaf

Places of Interest

The Idriss Mosque in Pinehurst has architecture unique to Seattle.  An octagonal dome and a symbolic minaret, both sheathed in copper and capped with crescent moons, red brick walls banded with buff brick and tall glass-block windows topped with concrete lintels in the shape of Moorish arches distinguish the first mosque in Seattle (1981) and the first mosque west of the Mississippi River to be built in a Middle Eastern design.

Mall

The Northgate Mall, opened in 1950, is the oldest, first regional historic shopping center called a mall, though there are 3 other shopping centers in the United States which predate it. At the time of its opening, it was located outside of the Seattle city limits, though this is no longer the case. It is located in the Maple Leaf neighborhood of Northgate.

Surrounding Northgate Mall are many strip malls and the "Northgate North" shopping center which features a Best Buy and a two-story Target.

Further reading

   See heading, "Note about limitations of these data".
   Elise Bowditch, Teaching Assistant; Man Wang, Teaching Assistant; Matthew W. Wilson, Research Associate.
 Page links to Village Descriptions Duwamish-Seattle section.Dailey referenced "Puget Sound Geography" by T. T. Waterman.  Washington DC:  National Anthropological Archives, mss. [n.d.] [ref. 2]; Duwamish et al. vs. United States of America, F-275.  Washington DC: US Court of Claims, 1927. [ref. 5]; "Indian Lake Washington" by David Buerge in the Seattle Weekly, 1–7 August 1984 [ref. 8]; "Seattle Before Seattle" by David Buerge in the Seattle Weekly, 17–23 December 1980. [ref. 9]; The Puyallup-Nisqually by Marian W. Smith.  New York: Columbia University Press, 1940. [ref. 10].Recommended start is "Coast Salish Villages of Puget Sound".
 
 
   Includes bibliography.
   Map of Licton Springs-North College Park.
 
 
   Sources for this atlas and the neighborhood names used in it include a 1980 neighborhood map produced by the Department of Community Development (relocated to the Department of Neighborhoods and other agencies), Seattle Public Library indexes, a 1984-1986 Neighborhood Profiles feature series in the Seattle Post-Intelligencer, numerous parks, land use and transportation planning studies, and records in the Seattle Municipal Archives.[Maps "NN-1120S", "NN-1130S", "NN-1140S".Jpg [sic] dated 13 June 2002; "NN-1030S", "NN-1040S".jpg dated 17 June 2002.]
 
 "with additions by Sunny Walter and local Audubon chapters."Viewing locations only; the book has walks, hikes, wildlife, and natural wonders.  Walter excerpted from
   "with additions by Sunny Walter and local Audubon chapters."  See "Northeast Seattle" section, bullet points "Meadowbrook", "Paramount Park Open Space", "North Seattle Community College Wetlands", and "Sunny Walter -- Twin Ponds".

Notes and references